Argamak (Arğımaq) is a rural locality (a village) in Dyurtyulinsky District, Bashkortostan, Russia. The population was 451 as of 2010.

Geography 
Argamak is located 3 km southeast of Dyurtyuli (the district's administrative centre) by road. Dyurtyuli is the nearest rural locality.

References 

Rural localities in Dyurtyulinsky District